Helly's theorem is a basic result in discrete geometry on the intersection of convex sets. Helly's theorem gave rise to the notion of a Helly family.

Statement
If the intersection of every  of these sets is nonempty, then the whole collection has a nonempty intersection; that is,

For infinite collections one has to assume compactness: 

Then the whole collection has nonempty intersection.

Proof
The infinite version then follows by the finite intersection property characterization of compactness: a collection of closed subsets of a compact space has a non-empty intersection if and only if every finite subcollection has a non-empty intersection (once you fix a single set, the intersection of all others with it are closed subsets of a fixed compact space).

The proof is by induction:

Base case: Let . Suppose that  is a point in the intersection of these two convex hulls. We claim that 

If , then , and therefore . Likewise, if , then , and by the same reasoning . Since  is in every , it must also be in the intersection.

Above, we have assumed that the points  are all distinct. This completes the proof in the case .

The argument above shows that any subcollection of  sets will have nonempty intersection. In this new collection, every subcollection of  sets will have nonempty intersection. The inductive hypothesis therefore applies, and shows that this new collection has nonempty intersection. This implies the same for the original collection, and completes the proof.

Colorful Helly theorem 

If, for every choice of a transversal – one set from every collection – there is a point in common to all the chosen sets, then for at least one of the collections, there is a point in common to all sets in the collection.

Figuratively, one can consider the d+1 collections to be of d+1 different colors. Then the theorem says that, if every choice of one-set-per-color has a non-empty intersection, then there exists a color such that all sets of that color have a non-empty intersection.

Fractional Helly theorem 

See also  
 Carathéodory's theorem
 Kirchberger's theorem
 Shapley–Folkman lemma
 Krein–Milman theorem
 Choquet theory
 Radon's theorem, and its generalization, Tverberg's theorem

Notes

References
.
. 
.
 Heinrich Guggenheimer (1977) Applicable Geometry, page 137, Krieger, Huntington  .
. 
.
.

Theorems in convex geometry
Theorems in discrete geometry
Articles containing proofs
Geometric transversal theory